Ditlef is a given name. Notable people with the name include:

Ditlef Hvistendahl Christiansen (1865–1944), Norwegian Supreme Court Justice
Ditlef Eckhoff (born 1942), Norwegian jazz musician

See also
Detlef

Norwegian masculine given names